Hilliard, also known as Kings, is an unincorporated community in Walker County, Alabama, United States.

History
Hilliard was the first county seat of Walker County before the county seat was moved to Jasper.

Notes

Unincorporated communities in Walker County, Alabama
Unincorporated communities in Alabama